Nog, played by Aron Eisenberg, is a recurring character on the science fiction television series Star Trek: Deep Space Nine (DS9). A member of the profit-driven alien species known as the Ferengi, he becomes the first Ferengi to join Starfleet. He is the nephew of the Ferengi bartender Quark, a major character on the series; the son of Quark's brother Rom; and a close friend of Jake Sisko, the son of Deep Space Nines protagonist Benjamin Sisko. Episodes of the series often paired Nog with Jake.

Nog is the main character in the episode "It's Only a Paper Moon", which was noted for exploring his recovery from post-traumatic stress disorder.

Fictional character biography
In the Star Trek universe, Nog was born to Rom and Prinadora on Ferenginar in 2353. Later, he moved with his father to Deep Space Nine and worked at his uncle Quark's bar. This time is depicted in DS9, and Nog is characterized as being very mischievous and a slight delinquent. Throughout the course of the series, Nog befriends Jake Sisko. In the first seasons of DS9 he is, though reluctantly, one of the first students in Keiko O'Brien's school. When Rom, under pressure from Quark and Grand Nagus Zek, pulls Nog out of school, Jake tutors him without Rom's knowledge ("The Nagus").

Recognizing his father's failure to capitalize on his proficiency in mechanics and electronics, and not wanting to follow in those footsteps, Nog resolves to go into a career where he can make something of himself. He requests a recommendation from Commander Benjamin Sisko to be admitted to Starfleet Academy ("Heart of Stone"). Although Sisko takes considerable convincing that this young Ferengi is serious in this uncharacteristically unprofitable ambition for his species, Nog is admitted with his recommendation and becomes the first Ferengi in Starfleet ("Facets").

Starfleet assigns Nog to Deep Space Nine as part of his cadet field training ("The Ascent"). Upon returning to the station, he and Jake become roommates. As a cadet, Nog works mainly under chief of operations Miles O'Brien. Nog receives a commission as ensign shortly before Starfleet retakes Deep Space Nine during the Dominion War ("Favor the Bold").

In the height of the Dominion War, Nog loses his leg due to a battle injury ("The Siege of AR-558"). Although a biosynthetic leg is grown for him to replace the amputated one, after months of therapy Nog still feels phantom pain in his new leg. Nog chooses a holosuite simulation of a Las Vegas nightclub as the place to recuperate from his trauma and adjust to using an artificial limb, living in the holosuite until the simulated nightclub singer Vic Fontaine forces him to leave ("It's Only a Paper Moon").

One of Sisko's final acts before joining the Prophets is to promote Nog to the rank of lieutenant junior grade (DS9: "What You Leave Behind").

In the 32nd century, Starfleet has named a starship after Nog. The USS Nog (an Eisenberg-class starship, named after the actor who portrayed him) is stationed at Federation headquarters. (Star Trek: Discovery: "Die Trying")

Appearances
Nog appears in the following episodes of Star Trek: Deep Space Nine:

Season 1

 Emissary
 A Man Alone
 The Nagus
 The Storyteller
 Progress

Season 2

 The Siege
 Sanctuary
 The Jem'Hadar

Season 3

 Life Support
 Heart of Stone
 Facets

Season 4

 The Visitor (alternate timeline version)
 Little Green Men
 Homefront
 Paradise Lost
 Shattered Mirror (Mirror Universe counterpart)

Season 5

 The Ascent
 The Darkness and the Light
 For the Uniform
 Soldiers of the Empire
 Blaze of Glory
 Empok Nor
 In the Cards
 Call to Arms

Season 6

 A Time to Stand
 Rocks and Shoals
 Behind the Lines
 Favor the Bold
 Sacrifice of Angels
 You Are Cordially Invited...
 The Magnificent Ferengi
 Far Beyond the Stars
 One Little Ship
 Valiant
 Profit and Lace
 Tears of the Prophets

Season 7

 Image in the Sand
 Take Me Out to the Holosuite
 Chrysalis
 Treachery, Faith, and the Great River
 The Siege of AR-558
 Covenant
 It's Only a Paper Moon
 Badda-bing, Badda-bang
 'Til Death Do Us Part
 The Changing Face of Evil
 When it Rains...
 The Dogs of War
 What You Leave Behind

Top episodes
The episode "It's Only a Paper Moon", focuses on Nog's recovery from the trauma of having lost his leg in the episode "The Siege of AR-558". These two episodes  were ranked as the 14th and 15th best of Star Trek: Deep Space Nine by The Hollywood Reporter in 2016.  Hollywood Reporter ranked "It's Only a Paper Moon" as the 56th best of all episodes of the Star Trek franchise aired by 2016, calling it a touching and ambitious story. The A.V. Club's Zack Handlen lauded Aron Eisenberg's acting in this episode, noting that his portrayal of Nog's PTSD "has some real edges to it, and some aspects of it should be familiar to anyone who's suffered a period of severe depression".

Stephanie Marceau, writing for Screen Rant, ranked the top ten episodes featuring Nog:

 It's Only A Paper Moon
Heart of Stone
 The Magnificent Ferengi
 The Jem'Hadar
 Treachery, Faith, and the Great River
 Badda-Bing Badda-Bang
 The Visitor
 Progress
 Valiant
 Empok Nor

Marceau says of "Its Only a Paper Moon" that "Watching Nog deal with his conflicted feelings and trauma about the war and Starfleet was powerful and inspiring" and found the show's treatment of the character's loss "respectful". Clint Worthington, writing for SyFy, felt "Heart of Stone", in which Nog decides to join Starfleet, was the most important Nog episode; he also noted "The Siege of AR-558", in which Nog is confronted with the hardships of war.

Reception
In 2016, the character of Nog was ranked as the 51st most important character of Starfleet within the Star Trek science fiction universe by Wired Magazine.

Richard A. Hall observed that not the least through the influence of his Starfleet neighbours, Nog becomes a more thoughtful and caring individual over the course of the show's run.

Discovery co-creator and co-showrunner Alex Kurtzman saw in Nog "a character who exemplified the possibility of resilience after a period of darkness". Malissa Longo, widow of the portrayer Aron Eisenberg, commented: "Nog was a trailblazer in DS9. I have no doubt that he would have left a lasting impression on the Federation".

In 2019, Clint Worthington writing for SyFy, said that Nog was "one of Star Trek's most aspirational characters" noting how the character progressed throughout the show. They point in the early seasons he "dragged Jake into one misadventure or another", a cackling sidekick for Jake, but then in "Heart of Stone" he has realization he does not like where is life is headed. With the help of Commander Sisko, he sets his dreams on Starfleet hoping to rise above the limited opportunities available to him.

CNN remembered Nog as the major role for actor Eisenberg in his career when he died in 2019.

References

Further reading

External links

 Nog at StarTrek.com

Ferengi
Television characters introduced in 1993
Fictional amputees
Star Trek: Deep Space Nine characters
Child characters in television
Starfleet engineers
Starfleet ensigns
Starfleet lieutenants